Lewis Walters (born 26 February 1988 in Nottingham) is a Jamaican squash player. He has represented Jamaica at the Commonwealth Games.

In 2019, Walters was named to Jamaica's 2019 Pan American Games team.

References

1988 births
Living people
Jamaican male squash players
Squash players at the 2019 Pan American Games
Pan American Games competitors for Jamaica